The 1880 Philadelphia Crescent Athletic Club football team represented Philadelphia Crescent Athletic Club in the 1880 college football season. The Athletic Club played at least two games in the season, results for the first have not been found, the second was a 0–5 loss against Penn.

Schedule

References

Philadelphia Crescent Athletic Club
Philadelphia Crescent Athletic Club football seasons
Philadelphia Crescent Athletic Club football